Heterodera gambiensis is a plant pathogenic nematode affecting pearl millet.

See also 
 List of pearl millet diseases

References

External links 
 Nemaplex, University of California - Heterodera gambiensis

gambiensis
Plant pathogenic nematodes
Pearl millet diseases